Naadumaskeri is a village in Uttar Kannada next to Gokarna.

Notable people
 S. R. Nayak

Villages in Uttara Kannada district